Marna is a village in Bardez taluk or sub-district in North Goa District of Goa State, India.

Location and panchayat
It is located in Siolim, and Siolim-Marna is one of the three village panchayats in the Siolim area.

Area, population
Marna has an area of 328.94 hectares, and a total of 298 households. It has 1234 residents, of these 569 are men and 665 are women.  In the zero-to-six age group, it has a population of 100 children, 47 boys and 53 girls.

Local services
The Goa-based non-profit organisation, the Indian Students Educational Aid Foundation (ISEAF) has a home nursing bureau, that is located at the Holy Cross Indo-German Techno Centre, in Marna. It launched a mobile nursing service in March 2018, to serve home-bound patients. It offered services such as the dressing of wounds, bladder wash, IV medication, home dialysis, nebulization, enema and the like.

Notes

Cities and towns in North Goa district